The following is a list of television series produced in Denmark.

0–9 
2. sal til højre og venstre
2900 Happiness

A
Aladdin eller Den forunderlige lampe
Album
Alle elsker Debbie
Alle os under himlen
Angora by Night
Anna - en fattig piges eventyr
Anna og Lotte
Anna Pihl
Anne og Poul
Anstalten
Anthonsen
Anton - min hemmelige ven
Antiglobetrotter
Apotekeren i Broager
Arvefjender
Aspiranterne
Asta-basta-bum
At ligge i sengen
Autoophuggerens Børn

B
Bamses billedbog
Bamses Lillebitte Billedbog
Barbara
Barda (rollespilsverden)
Begær, lighed og broderskab
Bingoland
Blekingegade
Blod, Sved og Springskaller
Blyppernes første år
Borgen
Broen
Bryggeren
Bullerfnis
Busters verden
Børn

C
Carmen & Colombo
Carsten og Gittes brevkasse
Carsten og Gittes Vennevilla
Casper & Mandrilaftalen
Chapper & Pharfar
Charlot og Charlotte
Cirkeline
Clausens garage
Container Conrad
Cosmos Chaos
Crash

D
D.A.S.K.
Da Lotte blev usynlig
Daniels dukke
Danish dynamite
Danmark ifølge Bubber
Danni
De 10 på Trelde Næs
De-næsten-gratis-glæder
De udvalgte
Decembervej
Den 8. himmel
Den gode, den onde og den virk'li sjove
Den gode vilje
Den grimme ælling og mig
Den lille forskel
Den otteøjede skorpion
Den serbiske dansker
Den som dræber
Der kan man se
Der var engang
Deroute
Det drejer sig om...
Det kongelige spektakel
Det Røde Kapel
Det vildeste Westen
Dicte
Dolph & Wulff med venner
Domino
Dr.Dip
Draculas ring
Drengen de kaldte kylling
Drengene fra Angora
Drengene fra Ølsemagle
Drengene og pigerne i klassen
Duksedrengen
Dybt vand
Døren går op - hvem kommer ind

E
Edderkoppen
Een stor familie
Else Kant
En by i provinsen
En fri mand
En gang strømer
En lille rød pakke
En nøgle til...?
Er du skidt skat?
Et par dage med Magnus

F
Fabrikshemmeligheden
Familien Christensen
Familien Edb'sen
Familien Krahne
Far, mor og Blyp
Farvel, jeg hedder Kurt
Feber i Fedtsted
Fif, fup og fiduser
Fikumdik
Fire portrætter
Fiskerne
Fjernsyn for dyr
Flemming og Berit
Flid, fedt og snyd
Forbrydelsen
Forestillinger
Forsvar
Fortsættelse følger
Forunderlige Frede
Fredagsbio
Frihed og ret
Frihedens skygge
Frøken Jensens pensionat
Fæhår og Hartzen

G
Ghettoprinsesse
Grundtvigs drøm
Guldregn
Gøngehøvdingen

H
Hamsun
Hatten I Skyggen
Hatten på arbejde
Hatten rundt
Hele den tyrkiske musik
Henover midten
Historietimen
Hjem til fem
Hjerteafdelingen
Hjerteflimmer
Hjælp... det er jul
Hotellet
Hulter til bulter - med Louise og Sebastian
Huset på Christianshavn
Hva' er der på Danmark
Hvide løgne
Hvor fanden er Herning?
Hvor svært kan det være

I
I sandhedens tjeneste
Ikk'
Ikke lutter lagkage
Ingermarie og Adam
Isas stepz

J
Jacob - a love story
Jason
Jeg vil ha' dig
Jeg ville ønske for dig
Jerusalem
Johanne i Troldeskoven
John, Alice, Peter, Susanne og lille Verner
Jul på Skovly
Julie
Jungledyret Hugo

K
Ka' De li' østers
Kaj & Andrea
Kaj Munk
Kald mig Liva
Kaos i opgangen
Karrusel
KatjaKaj & BenteBent
Kidnapning
Kirsebærhaven 89 : et stykke om / af fremtidens Danmark
Kissmeyer Basic
Klassen
Klitgården
Klovn
Kongekabale
Kongen, dronningen og hendes elsker
Kongeriget
Krigsdøtre
Kristian
Krysters kartel
Krøniken
Kun en pige
Københavnerliv

L
Landsbyen
Langt fra Las Vegas
Lillefinger
Limbo
Livsens Ondskab
Livvagterne
Ludo
Ludvigsbakke
Lulu & Leon
Lunas hemmelige plan
Lykke
Lærkevej
Løgnhalsen

M
Madsen og Co.
Magnus og Myggen
Maj & Charlie
Mandarinskolen
Manden fra Mormugao
Manden med de gyldne ører
Matador
Max
Med Sussi på loftet
Mellem venner
Mette alene hjemme
Miki - 3 år
Mildest talt
Mille
Mille og Mikkel
Mira + Marie
Mit liv som Bent
Mor er major
Mr. Poxycat & Co
Mørklægning

N
Nana
Niels Klims underjordiske rejse
Nikolaj og Julie
Normalerweize
Nu er det ikke sjovt længere
Nynne (tv-series)
Nævningene

O
Odas skolehistorier
Olsen-bandens første kup
Om at bestemme
Omar og ondskabens akse
Omar skal giftes
Omsen & Momsen
Op på ørerne, vi er kørende
Operation Negerkys
Opfinderkontoret
Opgang
Osman og Jeppe

P
P.I.S. – Politiets Indsats Styrke
Pandaerne
Parasitterne
Parløb
Pas på mor
Perforama
Pernille
Petersens morgen, middag og aften
Piger på prøveløsladelse
Pip & Papegøje
Plan B
Prisgivet
Pænt goddag
På ferie hos mormor

R
Radio Karen
Ras og Kathy
Rasmus Klump
Regnvejr og ingen penge
Rejseholdet (1983)
Rejseholdet (2000)
Renters rente
Ret beset
Riget
Ridder Ræddik
Rita
Robin Hat og jagten på den forsvundne skat
Rockerne
Ronnie Rosé siger helt godnat
Rune Klan's Trylleshow
Russian Pizza Blues
Rytteriet

S
Sallies historier
Sangen om 8a
Sejlturen
Settet.dk
Sigurd og operaen
Sigurd og symfoniorkestret
Sigurds Bjørnetime
SK 917 er netop landet
Skattekortet
Skjulte spor
Skrumpen fra det ydre rum
Skråplan
Skæbner i hvidt
Slemme Slemme piger
Smuglerne
Snuden
Sommer
Sonja fra Saxogade
Sonny Soufflé Chok Show
Specialklassen
Stand-up.dk
Station 13
Stine, Anders og Jeanette
Store Drømme
Strandskoven
Strandvaskeren
Strenge tider
Strisser på Samsø
Sulevælling
Super Carla
Susan fra Sommerstedgade
Søndage med Karl og Gudrun
Søndagsbio
Søren Kierkegaard Roadshow
Sørøver Sally
Søskende
Så er der loppemarked
Så hatten passer

T
Tak for i aften - Øgendahl & Klan on tour
Tak fordi vi kom
Tango for tre
TAXA
Teatret ved Ringvejen
Timm & Gordon
Tjeneren
Toast
Tonny Toupé-show - tv, der dræber!
Tre ludere og en lommetyv
Trio van Gogh
Troldebjerget
Trolderi
Tung Metal
Tyllefyllebølleby Banegård
TV Sluk i TV Byen

U
Ude på Noget
Udvikling
Ugeavisen
Ugen ud
Ugler i mosen
Ulf og Claus Show
Ungdomssvin
Unge Andersen

V
Ved Stillebækken
Venner 4ever (1. afsnit af Mille)
Vores år
VQ – Videnskabsquiz for hele hjernen

Y
Y's Fantom farmor

Z
Zulu Djævleræs
Zulu Gumball

Ø
Øen
Ørnen

Julekalendere
Christmas calendars listed with year(s) of broadcasting and station(s) broadcasting. There is usually a single season which may have reruns in December of later years.

Absalons hemmelighed (2006, 2010, DR1 / 2010, Ramasjang)
Alle tiders jul (1994, 2004, TV2)
Alletiders julemand (1997, 2007, TV2)
Alle tiders nisse (1995, 2006, TV2)
Andersens julehemmelighed : en kriminallystspilskomedie (1993, 1998, TV2)
Avisen (1982, 1990, 1997, DR1)
Bamses julerejse (1996, 1999, 2005, DR1 / 2012, Ramasjang)
Besøg på decembervej (1968, DR1)
Bonus og Minus (1964, DR1)
Brødrene Mortensens jul (1998, 2002, TV2)
Børnenes ulandskalender (1966, DR1)
Cirkus Julius (1988, DR1)
CWC - Canal Wild Card (2002, TV2)
CWC World (2003, TV2 / 2003, 2005, Zulu)
De to i ledvogterhuset (1969, DR1)
Den hemmelige tunnel (1997, DR1)
Eldorado for dyr (1985, DR1)
Fru Pigalopp og juleposten (1978, DR1)
Gufol mysteriet, by rebroadcasting in 2004 called: Station 7-9-13 (1997, 2004, TV2)
Hallo det er jul! (1995, DR1)
Historier fra hele verden (1962, DR1)
Hjælp, det er jul (2011, DR2)
Hos Ingrid og lillebror (1971, DR1)
Hvad en møller kan komme ud for, når der er nisser på loftet (1970, DR1)
Jesus & Josefine (2003, 2009, TV2)
Jul i den gamle Trædemølle (1990, 1996, 2009, TV2)
Jul i Gammelby (1979, 1983, 1994, DR1, 2009, Ramasjang)
Jul i hjemmeværnet (2001, DR2)
Jul i Juleland (1993, TV2)
Jul i Svinget (2007, DR1 / 2010, Ramasjang)
Jul i Valhal (2005, 2012, TV2)
Jul i verdensrummet (2006, DR2)
Jul og grønne skove, also called: Poul og Nulle i hullet (1980, DR1)
Jul på Kronborg (2000, 2004, DR1)
Jul på slottet (1986, 1991, 1998, DR1)
Jul på Vesterbro (2003, 2004, 2009, DR2)
Julefandango (2008, 2009, DR1)
Julestjerner (2012, DR1 / 2012, Ramasjang)
Juleteatret (1965, DR1)
Juletestamentet (1995, 1999, TV2)
Jullerup Færgeby (1974, 1982, 1990, 1997, DR1)
Kender du decembervej ? (1967, DR1)
Kikkebakke Boligby (1977, 1985, DR1)
Krummernes jul (1996, 2001, TV2)
Ludvig og Julemanden (2011, TV2)
Magnus Tagmus (1971, DR1)
Martin & Ketil - jul for begyndere (2005, 2009, TV2 / 2005, Zulu)
Mikkel og guldkortet (2008, TV2)
Mumidalen (1980, DR1)
Nissebanden (1984, 1992, 2001, DR1)
Nissebanden i Grønland (1989, 1993, 2002, 2011, DR1 / 2011, Ramasjang)
Nisserne Tim og Tam (1963, DR1)
Nissernes Ø (2003, 2008, DR1)
Noget om nisser (1972, DR1)
Olsen-bandens første kup (1999, TV2)
Omars jul (2005, DR2)
Pagten (2009, DR1, Ramasjang)
 Poul og Nulle i hullet. Nickname for "Jul og grønne skove" (1980, DR1)
Pyrus i alletiders eventyr (2000, 2010, TV2)
Skibet i skilteskoven (1992, TV2)
 "Station 7-9-13" was the retitling of Gufol mysteriet in 2004 (TV2)
The Julekalender (1991, 1994, 2001, 2008, 2010, 2011, 2012, TV2)
Torvet (1981, 1987, DR1)
Vinterbyøster (1973, 1976, DR1)
Vumserne og juleforberedelser (1975, DR1)
Yallahrup Færgeby (2007, DR2)

External links
Link to a Danish film and tv database (in Danish)
 Danish TV at the Internet Movie Database

 
Denmark
Television series